A keg stand is a drinking activity where the participant does a handstand on a keg of beer and attempts to drink as much as possible at once or to drink for as long as possible.
Other people will help hold up the drinker's legs, and will hold the keg tap in the stander's mouth, as they will have both hands occupied with the handstand.

The keg stand is particularly popular as part of student drinking culture in the United States.

In popular culture
 In Community, Troy (Donald Glover) is a star football recruit until he breaks both arms while executing a "keg flip," a rare and difficult variant on the keg stand.
 In Scream 2, a character can be seen doing a keg stand in the background at the Omega Beta Zeta mixer.
 In Stranger Things, the newly introduced character Billy Hargrove takes the title of "Keg King" from Steve Harrington during his first party in Hawkins.
 In It's Always Sunny in Philadelphia, members of the gang can be seen doing keg stands at an underage party in the episode "Underage Drinking: A National Concern".
 In The Sims 3 expansion pack University Life, Sims are able to perform a keg stand.
 In the song Frog On The Floor by 100 gecs, Laura Les describes a frog that "got on his front legs and did a keg stand".

References

Drinking culture
Drinking games